Pidlissia is a village in Chortkiv Raion (district) of Ternopil Oblast (province) in western Ukraine. It belongs to Buchach urban hromada, one of the hromadas of Ukraine. Strypa River flows about 1 km from the western edge of the village.

History 
First written mention comes from the 19th century. Then Pidlissia belonged to the Kingdom of Galicia and Lodomeria, a part of Austrian-Hungarian empire, in 1918-1919 to West Ukrainian People's Republic.

For a long time until 1939 Polish population predominanted in the village.

Until 18 July 2020, Pidlissia belonged to Buchach Raion. The raion was abolished in July 2020 as part of the administrative reform of Ukraine, which reduced the number of raions of Ternopil Oblast to three. The area of Buchach Raion was merged into Chortkiv Raion.

References

External links 

  Pidlissia, Buchach Raion
 Pidlissia, google maps
 .

Villages in Chortkiv Raion